Luke Ferrara (born 7 June 1993) is a British ice hockey player who currently plays for UK EIHL side Nottingham Panthers. A member of the British national team, Ferrara previously played with the Cardiff Devils, Sheffield Steelers and Coventry Blaze.

He represented Great Britain at the 2019 IIHF World Championship, 2021 IIHF World Championship and 2022 IIHF World Championship.

Personal life
Ferrara's older brothers Robert and James are both former hockey players. They last played for NIHL side Peterborough Phantoms before retiring at the end of the 2019–20 season.

Career
Ferrara began his career with the Peterborough Phantoms, before playing one Elite League game with Cardiff Devils during the 2012–13 season. He joined Sheffield Steelers ahead of the 2014–15 season, moving to Coventry in 2017.

Ahead of the 2020-21 Elite League season, Ferrara originally agreed a new two-year deal to remain in Coventry. However, following the suspension of the 2020-21 Elite League campaign, he was allowed to seek opportunities elsewhere.

The forward subsequently agreed an initial one-month contract in October 2020 with French Ligue Magnus side Boxers de Bordeaux. However he left upon the expiration of that deal in November.

On 29 November 2020 Ferrara moved to Polska Hokej Liga side Cracovia Krakow on a deal until the end of the season.

Ferrara returned to Coventry to take part in the 2021 'Elite Series'. He later returned to Coventry for the 2021-22 Elite League season.

In June 2022, Ferrara left Coventry after the best part of five years with the team, switching to fellow Elite League side Nottingham Panthers for the 2022-23 season.

Career statistics

Regular season and playoffs

References

External links

1993 births
Boxers de Bordeaux players
Cardiff Devils players
Coventry Blaze players
English ice hockey forwards
English people of Italian descent
MKS Cracovia (ice hockey) players
Nottingham Panthers players
Living people
Peterborough Phantoms players
Sheffield Steelers players
Sportspeople from Peterborough
British expatriate ice hockey people
English expatriate sportspeople in France
English expatriate sportspeople in Poland
Expatriate ice hockey players in France
Expatriate ice hockey players in Poland